The Argyn tribe (or clan) is a constituent of the Kazakh ethnicity. The Argyn are a component, of the Orta jüz (Орта жүз; "Middle Horde" or "Middle Hundred"). Kazakhs historically consisted of three tribal federations: the Great jüz (or Senior jüz), Middle jüz, and Little jüz (or Junior jüz). Karakhanid scholar Mahmud al-Kashgari glossed Arghu as "ravine between two mountains", because the Arghu country was located between Tiraz and Balasagun.

Argyns are of mixed origins. A historical bilingual, yet steadily Turkicizing, people, Basmyls, likely contributed to the ethnogenesis of Argyns because both Basmyls and Argyns occupied roughly the same geographic location,<ref>Gumilyov, L. Searches for an Imaginary Kingdom: The trefoil of the Bird's Eye View' Ch. 5: The Shattered Silence (961-1100)</ref> in Beiting Protectorate, where Basmyls made their first recorded appearanceZizhi Tongjian; cited by Zuev Yu.A., Horse Tamgas from Vassal Princedoms (translation of 8-10th century Chinese Tanghuyao), Kazakh SSR Academy of Sciences, Alma-Ata, 1960, p. 104, 132 (in Russian) and which is now in western China, and still home to a Kazakh minority. Kara-Khanid scholar Mahmud al-Kashgari wrote that Basmyls spoke their own language besides Turkic.

The name of the Argyns probably corresponds to that of the "Argons" mentioned by Marco Polo in a country called "Tenduc" (around modern-day Hohhot) during the 13th century. Polo reported that this clan who had "sprung from two different races: to wit, of the race of the Idolaters of Tenduc and ... the worshippers of Mahommet. They are handsomer men than the other natives of the country, and having more ability, they come to have authority; and they are also capital merchants." Kashgari mentioned an urban Argu people who spoke Middle Turkic with "a certain slurring (rikka'')", like people of Sogdak and Kenchek; Golden proposes that the Arghu were Iranian speakers undergoing Turkicization.

A 2013 study on Argyns genetics identifies twenty Y-chromosome DNA haplogroups: of these, G1a-P20 constitutes 71% of 2186 samples; R1a*-M198(xM458) 6%, C3c-M48 5%, C3* - M217(xM48) 3%; and other haplogroups represent less than three percent. The authors noted that "Tribe Argyn took on graph an isolated position, demonstrating the absence of genetic links with other Kazakh tribes."

See also 
Basmyl
Madjars

References

Ethnic groups in Kazakhstan
Ethnic groups in China
Turkic peoples of Asia